Kerle is a surname. Notable people with the surname include:

Brian Kerle (born 1945), Australian basketball player and coach
Clive Kerle (1915–1997), Australian Anglican bishop
Gaspard Kerle, alias of Johann Caspar Kerll (1627–1693), German composer and organist